Vera Jackson (July 21, 1911 – January 26, 1999) was a "pioneer woman photographer in the black press". She photographed African-American social life and celebrity culture in 1930s and 1940s Los Angeles. Noted photographic subjects included major league baseball player Jackie Robinson, educator Mary McLeod Bethune, and actresses Dorothy Dandridge, Hattie McDaniel and Lena Horne.

Biography
Jackson was a freelance photographer with the California Eagle. Editor Charlotta Bass later hired her as a staff photographer and often paired her to work with society editor Jessie Mae Brown (later Jessie Brown Beavers) until Brown left for the Los Angeles Sentinel.

When Jackson left the California Eagle, she earned both her B.A. (1952) and Master’s (1954) in education and became a Los Angeles University School District teacher. She retired after 25 years.

During her teaching career, Jackson continued with freelance photography.  Her work has been exhibited at the UCLA Gallery, the Riverside Art Museum, the Black Gallery of Los Angeles, and the National Museum of Women in the Arts, as well as the Los Angeles Country Public Library, the Afro-American Museum of History and Culture in Los Angeles and the Museum of Art in San Francisco.

Exhibitions

Collections
 Akron Art Museum A Vera Jackson photograph was also included in an Akron Art Museum exhibit A History of Women Photographers.
 Charlotta Bass & California Eagle Photograph Collection, 1870-1960, USC

References

Further reading
 . Includes photographs by and conversations with Vera Jackson, who knew the Dandridge and her family from Wichita, Kansas.
 .
 . This film has been shown on PBS.
 .  
 . 
 .   
 . This film includes interview with Vera Jackson and has been shown on PBS.
 .
 .

External links 
 Vera Ruth Jackson on the African American Visual Artists Database
 
 Vera Jackson photographs in the UCLA Library collection

1911 births
1999 deaths
American photojournalists
20th-century American photographers
African-American photographers
California State University, Los Angeles alumni
University of Southern California alumni
20th-century American women photographers
20th-century African-American women
20th-century African-American artists
Photographers from California
Women photojournalists